Trent John Alexander-Arnold (born 7 October 1998) is an English professional footballer who plays as a right-back for  club Liverpool and the England national team. Known for his range of passing, crossing and assists, Alexander-Arnold is widely regarded as one of the best full-backs in world football.

Alexander-Arnold joined Liverpool's academy in 2004 and captained the club across its youth levels. He made his senior debut in 2016, at age 18, and played in back-to-back UEFA Champions League finals in 2018 and 2019, winning the latter, and being named in the Champions League Squad of the Season. These appearances made Alexander-Arnold the youngest player to start in consecutive finals in the competition. In the same year, he won the UEFA Super Cup and the FIFA Club World Cup. In domestic football, he won the 2019–20 PFA Young Player of the Year and the inaugural Premier League Young Player of the Season awards, has thrice been named in the PFA Team of the Year, and helped end Liverpool's 30-year league title drought by winning the 2019–20 Premier League. He also won both domestic cups (the EFL Cup and FA Cup) in the 2021–22 season.

Alexander-Arnold has also represented England at various youth levels and made his senior debut in 2018. He has since featured at the 2018 FIFA World Cup, where he became only the fourth teenager to start a match for England in the tournament, in the 2018–19 UEFA Nations League, where his nation finished in third place in the inaugural edition of the competition, and the 2022 World Cup.

Early life, education and early career
Trent John Alexander-Arnold was born on 7 October 1998 in West Derby, Liverpool. He attended St Matthew's Catholic Primary School, before later enrolling at St Mary's in Crosby. When he was six years old, local football club Liverpool hosted a half-term camp to which a number of pupils from his school were invited, and his was one of the names drawn from a hat to attend. There, he was spotted by academy coach Ian Barrigan who subsequently approached his parents to offer him the chance to join the club's academy. He began training two-to-three times a week, and in a variety of different positions, before later going on to captain the club at U16 and U18 level under coach Pepijn Lijnders. In the intervening period, at the age of 14, he left St. Mary's to enroll at Rainhill High School, an educational institution which shares an affiliation with the football club.

Club career

Early professional career
During his time in Liverpool's academy Alexander-Arnold converted from a wide midfielder to a right-back. It was the position that offered him the clearest path to the first team and he excelled in his new role, being singled out by former Liverpool captain Steven Gerrard, who tipped him to have a bright future at the club in his autobiography. As a result of his rapid progression, and in the buildup to the 2015–16 season, Alexander-Arnold was selected in the first team squad by manager Brendan Rodgers for the team's final pre-season friendly against Swindon Town where he marked his unofficial debut for the club in a 2–1 win.

Liverpool

2016–17 season: Development and breakthrough
Having previously taken part in Liverpool's pre-season tour of the United States, Alexander-Arnold made his professional debut on 25 October 2016, starting in a 2–1 victory over Tottenham Hotspur in the fourth round of the EFL Cup. He was booked in the first half for a foul on Ben Davies, which he later revealed could have ended in him being sent off, before being substituted for first-choice right-back Nathaniel Clyne in the 68th minute. Despite the indiscretion, his performance earned a spot in the EFL Cup Team of the Round alongside teammate Daniel Sturridge.

Alexander-Arnold's breakthrough into the first team was rewarded with a new long-term contract in November and he started in Liverpool's next EFL Cup match later that month against Leeds United. He was named man of the match for his performance after registering his first assist for the club by setting up striker Divock Origi for the opening goal of a 2–0 win for Liverpool. He then made his Premier League debut on 14 December, coming on as a late substitute in a 3–0 win over Middlesbrough, and made his first league start in a 1–1 draw with Manchester United on 15 January 2017. In May, having made 12 appearances across all competitions, he was named Liverpool's Young Player of the Season and was also nominated for the Premier League 2 Player of the Season award.

2017–18 season: First Champions League Final
In the buildup to the 2017–18 season, regular right-back Clyne suffered a serious back injury which afforded Alexander-Arnold the opportunity to rotate with Joe Gomez during the early stages of the campaign. On 15 August 2017, he scored his first goal for the club when he struck home from a free kick in a 2–1 first leg Champions League play-off round win over Bundesliga team 1899 Hoffenheim. In doing so, he became the third youngest player to score on his European debut for Liverpool, after Michael Owen and David Fairclough. During the group stages of the competition, Alexander-Arnold scored again in a 7–0 Champions League win over Maribor on 17 October, a result which was the joint-largest ever away win in the competition, and largest away win by an English club. He then scored his first Premier League goal for Liverpool on Boxing Day, netting in a 5–0 win over Swansea City at Anfield.

In March the following year, Alexander-Arnold endured his most difficult spell with the club to date, after struggling against Crystal Palace winger Wilfried Zaha and Manchester United's Marcus Rashford in successive weeks. Nonetheless, he retained his position in Liverpool's starting line-up to become the youngest English player to start in a Champions League quarter-final match and performed strongly in a 3–0 win over English rivals Manchester City in April. His performance saw him named man of the match and earned him praise from the media for his ability to nullify City winger Leroy Sané. He impressed again in the reverse fixture as Liverpool eliminated City 5–1 on aggregate to advance to the semi-finals of the competition for the first time in 10 years. On 10 May, his domestic and European form was rewarded when he won the Liverpool Young Player of the Season award for the second season running. Later that month, he became the youngest Liverpool player to start in a Champions League final when he was named in the starting line-up against two-time reigning champions, Real Madrid. Tasked with marking Cristiano Ronaldo, he performed admirably though Liverpool ultimately succumbed to a 3–1 defeat. Following the conclusion of the season, in which he scored three goals in 33 appearances across all competitions, he was nominated for the Golden Boy award where he was later voted runner-up to Ajax defender, Matthijs de Ligt.

2018–19 season: Regular starter and Champions League title
During the early stages of the following season, he made his 50th appearance for Liverpool when he started in a 2–1 victory over Tottenham; the same opposition against whom he had made his debut almost two years prior. In October, he was one of 10 players nominated for the inaugural Kopa Trophy, an award presented by France Football to the best young player under the age of 21, and ultimately ended sixth in the voting polls, having received votes from Owen, Denis Law and Pavel Nedvěd. He continued to enhance his burgeoning reputation in the months thereafter and was consistently listed in reports by the CIES as the world's most valuable full-back from a transfer value perspective. Alexander-Arnold elevated his game further following the turn of the year and, on 27 February 2019, became the youngest player, aged 20 years and 143 days, to record three assists in a single Premier League match when he set up Sadio Mané twice and Virgil van Dijk once in a 5–0 win over Watford. Less than two months later, he became the fifth-youngest player to reach 50 Premier League appearances for the club, behind Owen, Raheem Sterling, Robbie Fowler and Gerrard, when he started in a 3–1 win over Southampton. His domestic form was rewarded later in April when he was nominated for the PFA Young Player of the Year award, although the award was won by Manchester City's Sterling, and he was later named in the PFA Team of the Year alongside Liverpool teammates Van Dijk, Mané and Andrew Robertson.

His creative prowess came to the fore once again in May when, during a 3–2 win over Newcastle United, Alexander-Arnold equalled the Premier League record for the most assists by a defender in a season, with his two assists in the match raising his tally to 11. It also saw him and Robertson, who had 11 assists of his own, become the first set of defenders from the same team to record double figures for assists in the same season. Three days later, with Liverpool trailing Barcelona 3–0 on aggregate after a first-leg defeat, he recorded two more assists, including an "instinctive corner" for Origi's winning goal, to help the club to a 4–3 aggregate victory and progress to a second consecutive Champions League final. On the final day of the domestic season, Alexander-Arnold assisted Mané in a 2–0 win over Wolverhampton Wanderers to break the Premier League record for the most assists by a defender in a domestic campaign, with 12, surpassing previous holders Andy Hinchcliffe, Leighton Baines and Robertson. He then started in the Champions League Final, a 2–0 win over Tottenham, and became the youngest player to start in two successive finals in the competition, breaking the record set by A.C. Milan's Christian Panucci in 1995. He was later named in the competition's Team of the Season and nominated for the Defender of the Season award.

2019–20 season: Ballon d'Or nomination and Premier League title

Alexander-Arnold began the 2019–20 campaign with his position as Liverpool's right-back cemented, and provided the assist for Origi's goal in the club's 4–1 opening game win over Norwich City. In doing so, he became only the eighth player in the Premier League era to register an assist in five consecutive games, and the first to do so for Liverpool. He appeared in subsequent wins over Southampton and Arsenal, as well as in Liverpool's triumph over Chelsea in the UEFA Super Cup where he scored a penalty in the shoot-out. He then scored his first goal of the season during Liverpool's 2–1 league win over the Blues from a set-piece routine that was later nominated for the Premier League Goal of the Month award. The following month, he was nominated for the 2019 Ballon d'Or award, alongside six of his Liverpool teammates.

On 2 November, at the age of 21 years and 26 days, he became the fourth-youngest player to reach 100 appearances for Liverpool, behind Owen, Sterling and Fowler, and marked the occasion by assisting Mané for the winning goal in a 2–1 victory over Aston Villa. Exactly one month later, he was voted as the 19th-best player in the world at the Ballon d'Or ceremony, and the highest-ranked full-back. He then made his FIFA Club World Cup debut during Liverpool's 2–1 semi-final win over reigning CONCACAF champions Monterrey, and provided the match-winning assist for Roberto Firmino in stoppage time after coming on as a substitute for James Milner. Three days later, he started and played the full 120 minutes as Liverpool were crowned champions for the first time in the club's history following a 1–0 win after extra time over Copa Libertadores champions Flamengo.

Upon returning from Qatar, Liverpool recorded a 4–0 league win over second-placed Leicester City during a match in which Alexander-Arnold played a hand in all four goals by scoring one, assisting two, and winning a penalty which was converted by Milner. He was later rewarded for his form with the Premier League Player of the Month award, becoming the first full-back to claim the honour since Micah Richards in 2007. Further recognition followed at the turn of the year, when he was named in the 2019 UEFA Team of the Year. Alexander-Arnold then played a starring role in Liverpool's 2–1 win over Wolves as the club extended their unbeaten run in the league to 40 matches. During the encounter, he assisted captain Jordan Henderson for the opening goal and in the process became the first defender in the competition's history to reach double figures for assists in multiple campaigns.

Towards the end of February, following a 3–2 win over West Ham United, he matched his league assist record from the campaign before and took his overall tally in the Premier League to 25, becoming the third-youngest player in the competition's history to reach a quarter-century of assists behind Cesc Fàbregas and Wayne Rooney. The season was temporarily suspended between March and June due to the outbreak of the COVID-19 pandemic, following which Alexander-Arnold helped Liverpool win their first league title in 30 years, and their first in the Premier League era. With the title secured, he then broke his own assist record on the penultimate day of the campaign when he set Firmino up to score in a 5–3 win over Chelsea. For his contributions during the season, he was awarded the inaugural Premier League Young Player of the Season award, won the PFA Young Player of the Year accolade and was named in the PFA Team of the Year.

2020–21 season: Further career milestones

Alexander-Arnold continued to feature prominently for Liverpool during the 2020–21 campaign and, on 9 December, became the youngest-ever player to captain the club in European competition, and third-youngest in any competition, when he donned the armband during the Reds' 1–1 Champions League draw against FC Midtjylland. Later that month, he was named in the 2020 FIFA FIFPro Men's World XI alongside teammates Alisson, Van Dijk and Thiago Alcântara, althewhile Liverpool set about its domestic title defence by topping the league standings by Christmas. 

However, both his and the club's form waned in the second half of the campaign which culminated in Alexander-Arnold's highly-publicised omission from Gareth Southgate's England squad for March's 2022 FIFA World Cup qualification matches against San Marino, Albania and Poland. As a result, his performances came under intense scrutiny following the international break and he was criticised for making defensive errors during Liverpool's 3–1 defeat to Real Madrid in the Champions League. In the Premier League, his form improved and he was lauded for his game-winning performances against Arsenal and Aston Villa, scoring the winning goal in the 90th minute of the latter fixture, and was shortlisted for the Premier League Player of the Month award for April. The following month, he recorded back-to-back assists in victories away to Manchester United, where Liverpool won for the first time in seven years, and West Bromwich Albion, where his 94th-minute corner was headed home by goalkeeper Alisson to keep the club's hopes of qualifying for the following season's Champions League alive.

2021–22 season: Domestic cup double 
On 30 July, Alexander-Arnold signed a new long-term contract with Liverpool. On 16 December, Alexander-Arnold scored Liverpool's third goal in a 3–1 home win against Newcastle United with a 25-yard strike into the top left corner of the goal in what was Liverpool's 2,000th top-flight win, the first club in English history to reach this landmark. In May 2022, following Liverpool's victory over Chelsea in the 2022 FA Cup Final, Alexander-Arnold became the youngest-ever player to win six major trophies, namely the FIFA Club World Cup, UEFA Champions League, UEFA Super Cup, Premier League, FA Cup and League Cup, for an English club, doing so at the age of 23 years and 219 days.

International career

Youth

Alexander-Arnold has represented England at various youth levels and featured at the 2015 FIFA U-17 World Cup in Chile. He also scored three goals for the England U19 team, including a brace against Croatia and another against Spain which secured England's qualification for the 2017 UEFA European Under-19 Championship. He did not feature at the tournament itself as Liverpool reached an agreement with England to rest him ahead of the following season's league campaign, but the Three Lions went on to defeat Portugal in the final to claim their first ever title in the competition. The month following the tournament, he was called up to the England U21 team for the first time for their UEFA European Under-21 Championship qualifiers against Netherlands and Latvia, and made his debut in a 3–0 win over the latter. Two more appearances followed with the U21 side before he was promoted and solidified his status within the senior England camp.

Senior
In March 2018, while part of the U21 team, Alexander-Arnold was invited to train with the senior national team for the first time ahead of their friendly matches against Italy and the Netherlands. He received his first call-up in May 2018 when he was named in Gareth Southgate's squad for the 2018 FIFA World Cup. His debut followed on 7 June 2018 when he started in a 2–0 pre-tournament friendly win over Costa Rica at Elland Road. Prior to the match, he was handed his match jersey by Prince William, Duke of Cambridge. Alexander-Arnold then made his debut in the competition on 28 June, starting in a 1–0 group-stage defeat to Belgium, after both sides had already confirmed their progression to the knockout stages. In doing so, he became only the fourth teenager to start a match for England at a World Cup. It remained, however, his only appearance as Kieran Trippier was preferred at right-back and featured throughout as England were defeated by Croatia in the semi-finals, and then again by Belgium in the third place play-off.

On 15 November 2018, during a friendly international, held in honour of Wayne Rooney, Alexander-Arnold scored his first senior international goal as England recorded a 3–0 win over the United States at Wembley Stadium. In doing so, and at the age of 20 years and 39 days, he became the youngest Liverpool player since Michael Owen in 1999 to score for the national team. In June 2019, he was part of the England squad which ended third at the inaugural UEFA Nations League and played the full match in a penalty shoot-out win over Switzerland in the third-place play-off. Two years later, he was named in England's 26-man squad for the UEFA Euro 2020 but was forced to withdraw eight days before the competition commenced after sustaining a thigh injury during a pre-tournament friendly against Austria.

On 10 November 2022, he was named in England's 26-man squad for the 2022 FIFA World Cup.

Player profile

Style of play
Known for his range of passing, crossing and assists, he is regarded as one of the best full-backs in world football, despite flaws in his defensive ability.

During the early years of his career, he emerged as one of the Premier League's most creative players due to his role in assisting goals from early crosses and set-piece deliveries. He possesses an impressive passing range, which is attributed to his development as a midfielder during his time in Liverpool's youth academy, and has been one of Liverpool's designated set-piece specialists for deadball situations since the 2017–18 campaign. His set-piece routine, which involves three parallel steps backwards and one to the right, has been likened to that of former rugby union fly-half Jonny Wilkinson. Alexander-Arnold's craft and intelligence from deadball situations was singled out for particular praise by Gary Lineker and Cesc Fàbregas after he assisted the winning goal in the 2018–19 Champions League semi-final by delivering a quickly-taken corner while the opposition players had their backs turned.

Under Liverpool manager Jürgen Klopp, whose tactical set-up placed creative responsibility on the shoulders of the club's full-backs, Alexander-Arnold was predominantly deployed down the right flank where his overlapping runs, switching of play, accuracy of crossing and work-rate in tracking back saw him become an important figure in the side's transitional, counter-attacking style of play.

Reception 
World Cup winner Cafu has heaped praise on the defender, saying "He's a sensational player, a rare talent. He's technically brilliant, he has so much quality. He has a Brazilian style of play. I love watching him play. And playing in such a great team will help him grow." Lionel Messi has called him "Impressive" and remarked "[He is] the future, a fullback who is impressive going forward." Former Manchester United defender Gary Neville stated, "He's the best passer of a ball at right-back that I've ever seen. He's David Beckham and Kevin De Bruyne at right-back".

Alexander-Arnold has often been the subject of criticism for his alleged lack of defensive capabilities. However, during the 20/21 season, a season during which this criticism intensified, he compared favourably with other English right-backs like Reece James and Kyle Walker, with his numbers ranking the best among them. He has been defended by his manager, who said "If anyone says Trent can't defend, they should come to me and I'll knock them down. I cannot hear that anymore, I don't know what the boy has to do!"

Personal life

Alexander-Arnold is the nephew of former Reading and Millwall footballer, and former Manchester United club secretary, John Alexander. His maternal grandmother, Doreen Carling, was once also in a relationship with former United manager, Alex Ferguson, before moving to New York City where she later married. Alexander-Arnold was thus eligible to play for the United States prior to making his England debut. He has two brothers; Tyler, who is four years his senior and acts as his agent, and Marcel, who is three years younger.

Outside of football, Alexander-Arnold volunteers as an ambassador for the Liverpool-based charity An Hour for Others, which seeks to provide underprivileged members of the community with anything from food hampers and toys to cooking and science lessons. He has supported the charity since being introduced to it by his mother in his mid-teens. During his time with Liverpool's academy, he and teammate Kris Owens pledged to support the initiative if either of them made it as professional footballers. His philanthropy also expands beyond the charity and in March 2019, after signing a new boot sponsorship with Under Armour (the second most lucrative boot deal in England behind Harry Kane's) he initiated plans to purchase plots in Liverpool and use the funds to construct new pitches for the community.

He is also an avid chess player, having been introduced to the game by his father as a youngster, and in 2018 he played an invitational match against world champion Magnus Carlsen. The match, which was played as part of a campaign to promote the sport, ended in defeat for Alexander-Arnold after seventeen moves; eight more than technology entrepreneur Bill Gates managed when he faced Carlsen in 2014. Alexander-Arnold later explained how chess was more than just a pastime and had helped him in his football career by teaching him to think "two or three moves ahead of the opposition".

In 2020, he and fellow Liverpool full-back Andrew Robertson starred in their own digital series on IGTV called Wingmen.

Career statistics

Club

International

England score listed first, score column indicates score after each Alexander-Arnold goal

Honours

Liverpool
Premier League: 2019–20
FA Cup: 2021–22
EFL Cup: 2021–22
FA Community Shield: 2022
UEFA Champions League: 2018–19; runner-up: 2017–18, 2021–22
UEFA Super Cup: 2019
FIFA Club World Cup: 2019

England
UEFA Nations League third place: 2018–19

Individual
Liverpool Young Player of the Season Award: 2016–17, 2017–18
PFA Team of the Year: 2018–19 Premier League, 2019–20 Premier League, 2021–22 Premier League
PFA Young Player of the Year: 2019–20 Premier League
UEFA Champions League Squad of the Season: 2018–19
UEFA Champions League Team of the Season: 2021–22
FIFA FIFPro World11: 2020
Premier League Player of the Month: December 2019, November 2021
IFFHS Men's World Team: 2019, 2020
UEFA Team of the Year: 2019
Premier League Young Player of the Season: 2019–20
ESM Team of the Year: 2019–20, 2021–22

References

External links

Profile at the Liverpool F.C. website
Profile at the Football Association website

1998 births
Living people
Footballers from Liverpool
English footballers
Association football defenders
Liverpool F.C. players
Premier League players
FA Cup Final players
UEFA Champions League winning players
England youth international footballers
England under-21 international footballers
England international footballers
2018 FIFA World Cup players
2022 FIFA World Cup players
Black British sportsmen